Arizona State Prison Phoenix-West is one of 13 prison facilities, a private prison operated by the GEO Group on contract with the Arizona Department of Corrections (ADC). ASP Phoenix-West is located in southwest Phoenix, Maricopa County, Arizona.

ASP Phoenix-West has an inmate capacity of approximately 470 in 1 housing unit at security levels 2. The ADC uses a score classification system to assess inmates appropriate custody and security level placement. The scores range from 1 to 5 with 5 being the highest risk or need. ASP Phoenix-West is a secure, minimum custody private prison.

See also 
List of U.S. state prisons
List of Arizona state prisons

References

External links 
Arizona Department of Corrections

Phoenix-West
Buildings and structures in Phoenix, Arizona
GEO Group